LaLigaSportsTV is an internet-broadcasting platform which, generally speaking, offers live Spanish sports competitions through multiple devices. It was created by the Liga Nacional de Fútbol Profesional in 2019.

Development 
Through an OTT service, which is standard for streaming film channels and series, LaLiga has created an internet-based television and video platform that offers all kinds of Spanish sports competitions live, in addition to several international competitions. It offers wide coverage of sports other than football, both live and on demand, and allows users to personalise content for different devices such as tablets, mobile phones, computers and smart TVs.

Through this platform, LaLiga contributes to the audiovisual development of sports other than football, following its commitment, established in 2015 within the framework of the LaLigaSports project, as a means for supporting other Spanish sports and stimulating the sports industry in general. Through the channel, Spanish sports federations are able to establish their own platform through which they can reach out to their fans and ascertain their preferences and consumption habits regarding these sports, and in doing so, allows them to design their own marketing and sponsorship strategies. The data collected as a result of these interactions facilitates a much more personalised recommendation of content for users.

LaLigaSportsTV provides a boost for both non-majority sports and their athletes, who are much more motivated when their tournaments and competitions can be followed by fans on audiovisual platforms.

Through the channel, Spanish sport have an innovative technological and audiovisual infrastructure, making it the first major European league to develop its own bespoke OTT service. The OTT platform can be accessed directly through smart TVs such as Samsung, LG, and Android TV, as well as allowing free and direct access from Orange TV. The digital ecosystem enables any user to access other LaLiga digital products.

The platform, which began broadcasting in March 2019, is an innovative initiative targeted at growing and developing internet channels that could occupy 50% of the market share by 2026 and which has seen its implementation boosted due to the COVID-19 pandemic.

Free and fee-paying content 
Users can access live broadcasts of a large majority of Spanish sports competitions for free.

Although the channel is intended to offer competitions from sports away from the more popular ones, it is also possible to access summaries of LaLiga Santander and LaLiga SmartBank matches, as well as different programs and specials that have soccer as a protagonist.

LaLiga Santander and LaLiga SmartBank teams have gradually been establishing exclusive channels on LaLigaSports TV, such as Cádiz CF, CA Osasuna, or RCD Mallorca.

More than 30 different sports 
After downloading the application on available devices, users are able to watch the following competitions live: the Women's First Division of Football;  the National Futsal League (LNFS), the ASOBAL Handball League, the LEB Gold Basketball League, among others.

In addition to the Spanish tournaments, international competitions such as the AFC Champions League, the Russian Premier Liga or the FIBA 3x3 World Tour basketball can be watched. Most of the sports have their own exclusive channels on the platform. This is the case of athletics, sports dancing, basketball, handball, boxing, e-sports, soccer, futsal, golf, weightlifting, field hockey, karate, mountain and climbing, sailing, pelota, petanque, surfing, tennis, triathlon and volleyball, among many other competitions and sports.

Football content on demand

LaLiga Nations 
A 10-episode series that analyzes the impact that players from around the globe have had on LaLiga.

LaLiga Clubs 
A 6-episode series that reveals the details of LaLiga Santander clubs.LaLiga Docs

90 years of stories 
13 programmes, each featuring an outstanding football star, from Lionel Messi to Paco Gento and Diego Rodriguez, providing an up close and personal look into these sporting legends and the records they have achieved.

LaLiga Archives 
A total of 24 programs can be accessed with reports on personalities, events or historical feats of Spanish soccer over the more than 90 years of Liga.

Historical summaries 
12-minute summaries of different LaLiga matches since the 1998-1999 season.

Historic matches 
Complete LaLiga matches since the 1998-1999 season.

La Película del Clásico 
8 programs, 50 minutes long, on one of the eight Clásicos played since 2015/16 including previously unseen footage.

Cambio de Banda 
Juan Pablo Villamil, the lead singer of the Colombian pop band Morat, hosts this fun talk-show that features different LaLiga soccer players answering his unconventional questions.

Specials 
Programs such as LaLiga Sube, LaLiga DetrásDeLasCámaras, LaLiga HoySeJuega, LaLiga VolverEsGanar or LaLiga QuédateEnCasa have captured the current affairs of the competition in times of pandemic.

Other content 
Interviews, programs, reports and documentaries on different sports such as surfing, petanque, golf, triathlon, tennis, basketball, boxing, snowboarding, among others, are also offered.

References

External links 
 LaLigaSportsTV
 LaLiga official website

Streaming television
Video on demand services
Sports television networks
Internet technology companies of Spain